Pierrick Maïa (born 16 February 1967) is a French ice hockey player. He competed in the men's tournament at the 1994 Winter Olympics.

References

1967 births
Living people
Olympic ice hockey players of France
Ice hockey players at the 1994 Winter Olympics
Sportspeople from Caen
Bowling Green Falcons men's ice hockey players
French expatriate sportspeople in the United States
French expatriate ice hockey people
Rouen HE 76 players